Békesi, Békési, Békésy or Békesy is a surname. Notable people with the surname include:
Eszter Békési (born 2002), Hungarian swimmer
Georg von Békésy (1899–1972), Hungarian biophysicist
Ilona Békési (born 1953), retired Hungarian gymnast
László Békesi (born 1942), Hungarian politician
Sándor Békési (1928–1994), Hungarian gymnast

Hungarian-language surnames